The men's 110 metres hurdles sprint competition of the athletics events at the 2011 Pan American Games took place between the 27 and 28 of October at the Telmex Athletics Stadium.  The defending Pan American Games champion was Dayron Robles of Cuba.

Records
Prior to this competition, the existing world and Pan American Games records were as follows:

Qualification
Each National Olympic Committee (NOC) was able to enter one athlete regardless if they had met the qualification standard.  To enter two entrants both athletes had to have met the minimum standard (14.40) in the qualifying period (January 1, 2010 to September 14, 2011).

Schedule

Results
All times shown are in seconds.

Semifinals
Held on October 27. The first three in each heat and the next two fastest advanced to the finals.

Wind:Heat 1: +0.6, Heat 2: +1.8

Final
Held on October 28.

Wind: +1.6

References

Athletics at the 2011 Pan American Games
2011